"Tell Me a Story" is the first single by Australian rock-pop band 1927's second studio album The Other Side (1990). The track was released in May 1990 and peaked at number 17 in May on the ARIA singles chart.

Track listing
CD single

Charts

Weekly charts

Year-end chart

References

1927 (band) songs
1990 songs
1990 singles
Warner Music Group singles